R709 road may refer to:
 R709 road (Ireland)
 R709 (South Africa)